The following lists events that happened during 2007 in Nigeria.

Incumbents

Federal government
 President: Olusegun Obasanjo (until 29 May), Umaru Musa Yar'Adua (starting 29 May)
 Vice President: Atiku Abubakar (until 29 May), Goodluck Jonathan (starting 29 May)
 Senate President: Ken Nnamani (Until May) David Mark (Starting June)
 House Speaker:
 Until 29 May: Aminu Bello Masari
 6 June – 30 October: Patricia Etteh
 Starting 1 November: Dimeji Bankole 
 Chief Justice: Salihu Moddibo Alfa Belgore (Until January) Idris Legbo Kutigi (Starting January)

Governors
 Abia State:
 Adamawa State: 
 Akwa Ibom State: 
 Anambra State: 
 Bauchi State: 
 Bayelsa State: 
 Bendel State: 
 Benue State: 
 Borno State: 
 Cross River State: 
 Delta State: 
 Eastern Region: 
 Ebonyi State: 
 Edo State: 
 Ekiti State: 
 Enugu State: 
 Gombe State: 
 Gongola State: 
 Imo State: 
 Jigawa State: 
 Kaduna State: 
 Kano State: 
 Katsina State: 
 Kebbi State: 
 Kogi State: 
 Kwara State: 
 Lagos State: 
 Nasarawa State: 
 Niger State: 
 Ogun State: 
 Ondo State: 
 Osun State: 
 Oyo State:
 Plateau State: 
 Rivers State: 
 until 29 May: Peter Odili (PDP) 
 29 May–25 October: Celestine Omehia (PDP)
 starting 25 October: Chibuike Amaechi (PDP)
 Sokoto State: 
 Taraba State: 
 Western State: 
 Yobe State:

Events

March
 March 27 - More than ninety people are burnt to death after a fire following a petrol spill in Kaduna State.

April
 April 4 - Four hostages held in the Niger Delta region are freed.
 April 14 - Nigerian voters go to the polls for state governor and legislative elections. Security is tight in the northern city of Kano following the murder of militant Islamic cleric Ustaz Ja'afar Adam.
 April 21 - Nigerian militants attack government buildings in the oil region hours before voters go to the polls in the general election.

 
2000s in Nigeria
Years of the 21st century in Nigeria
Nigeria
Nigeria